Gramercy Park is the name of both a small, fenced-in private park and the surrounding neighborhood that is referred to also as Gramercy, in Manhattan in New York City.

The approximately  park, located in the Gramercy Park Historic District, is one of two private parks in New York City – the other is Sunnyside Gardens Park in Queens – as well as one of only three in the state; only people residing around the park who pay an annual fee have a key, and the public is not generally allowed in – although the sidewalks of the streets around the park are a popular jogging, strolling, and dog-walking route.

The neighborhood is mostly located within Manhattan Community District 6, with a small portion in Community District 5. It is generally perceived to be a quiet and safe area.

The neighborhood, associated historic district, and park have generally received positive reviews. Calling it "a Victorian gentleman who has refused to die", Charlotte Devree in The New York Times said that "There is nothing else quite like Gramercy Park in the country." When the New York City Landmarks Preservation Commission created the Gramercy Park Historic District in 1966, they quoted from John B. Pine's 1921 book, The Story of Gramercy Park:

Boundaries
Gramercy Park itself is located between East 20th Street (called Gramercy Park South at the park), and East 21st Street (called Gramercy Park North), and between Gramercy Park West and Gramercy Park East, two mid-block streets which lie between Park Avenue South and Third Avenue. Irving Place commences at the southern end of Gramercy Park, running to 14th Street, and Lexington Avenue, a major north-south thoroughfare on the East Side of Manhattan, terminates at the northern end.

The neighborhood's boundaries are 14th Street to the south, Third Avenue to the east, 23rd Street to the north, and Park Avenue South to the west. Nearby are the Flatiron District to the west, Union Square to the southwest, the East Village to the south, Stuyvesant Town and Peter Cooper Village to the east, Rose Hill to the northwest, and Kips Bay to the northeast.

The boundaries of the Historic District, set in 1966 and extended in 1988, are irregular, lying within the neighborhood, and can be seen in the map in the provided infobox. A proposed extension to the district would include more than 40 additional buildings on Gramercy Park East and North, Lexington Avenue, Park Avenue South, East 22nd and East 19th Streets, and Irving Place.

Etymology
The brook, which later become known as Crommessie Vly, flowed in a 40-foot gully along what is now 21st Street into the East River at 18th Street. / became corrupted to Crommessie or Crommashie. Mayor James Duane – for whom the city's Duane Street is named – acquired the site in 1761 from Gerardus Stuyvesant and named it Gramercy Seat. Gramercy is an archaic English word meaning 'many thanks'.

History

Origin and development
The area which is now Gramercy Park was once in the middle of a swamp. In 1831 Samuel B. Ruggles, a developer and advocate of open space, proposed the idea for the park due to the northward growth of Manhattan. He bought the property, 22 acres of what was then a farm called "Gramercy Farm", from the heirs of James Duane, son of the former mayor, father of James Chatham Duane, and a descendant of Peter Stuyvesant. Ruggles then deeded the land on December 17, 1832 to five trustees, who pledge to hold 42 lots in trust to be used as parkland. To develop the property, Ruggles spent $180,000 to landscape it, draining the swamp and causing about a million horsecart loads of earth to be moved. He then laid out "Gramercy Square", deeding possession of the square to the owners of the 66 parcels of land he had plotted to surround it, and sought tax-exempt status for the park, which the city's Board of Aldermen granted in 1832.  It was the second private square created in the city, after Hudson Square, also known as St. John's Park, which was laid out by the parish of Trinity Church. Numbering of the lots began at No. 1 on the northwest corner, on Gramercy Park West, and continued counter-clockwise: south down Gramercy Park West, then west to east along Gramercy Park South (East 20th Street), north up Gramercy Park East, and finally east to west along Gramercy Park North (East 21st Street).

As part of his overall plan for the square, Ruggles received permission on January 28, 1833 from the Board of Alderman to open up Fourth Avenue, which had been limited to use by trains, to vehicular traffic. He also brought about the creation by the state legislature of Lexington Avenue and Irving Place, two new north-south roads laid out between Third and Fourth Avenues and feeding into his development at the top and bottom of the park. The new streets reduced the number of lots around the park from 66 to 60.

Gramercy Park was enclosed by a fence in 1833, but construction on the surrounding lots did not begin until the 1840s, due to the Panic of 1837. In one regard this was fortunate, since the opening of the Croton Aqueduct in 1842 allowed new townhouses to be constructed with indoor plumbing.

The first formal meeting of the park's trustees took place in 1844 at 17 Union Square (West), the mansion of James W. Gerard, which is no longer extant, having been demolished in 1938. By that time, landscaping had already begun with the hiring of James Virtue in 1838, who planted privet inside the fence as a border; by 1839 pathways had been laid out and trees and shrubs planted. Major planting also took place in 1844 – the same year the park's gates were first locked – followed by additional landscaping by Brinley & Holbrook in 1916.  These plantings had the effect of softening the parks' prim formal design.

Later 19th century events
In 1863, in an unprecedented gesture, Gramercy Park was opened to Union soldiers involved in putting down the violent Draft riots which broke out in New York, after conscription was introduced for the Civil War. Gramercy Park itself had been protected with howitzers by troops from the Eighth Regiment Artillery, while the 152nd New York Volunteers encamped in nearby Stuyvesant Square.

At No. 34 and No. 36 Gramercy Park (East) are two of New York's first apartment buildings, designed in 1883 and 1905. In addition, No. 34 is the oldest existing co-operative apartment building in the city. Elsewhere in the neighborhood, nineteenth century brownstones and carriage houses abound, though the 1920s brought the onset of tenant apartments and skyscrapers to the area.

In 1890 an attempt was made to run a cable car through the park to connect Irving Place to Lexington Avenue. The bill passed the New York State Legislature, but was vetoed by Governor David B. Hill. Twenty-two years later, in 1912, another proposal would have connected Irving Place and Lexington Avenue, bisecting the park, but was defeated through the efforts of the Gramercy Park Association, now called Gramercy Neighborhood Associates.

In the late 19th century, numerous charitable institutions influential in setting social policy were located on 23rd Street, and some, such as the Federation of Protestant Welfare Agencies, still remain in the area. Calvary Church on Gramercy Park North has a food pantry that opens its doors once a week for one hour, and the Brotherhood Synagogue on Gramercy Park South served as an Underground Railroad station before the Civil War, when the building was a Quaker meeting house, established in 1859.

20th and 21st centuries

The Hotel Irving, at 26 Gramercy Park South, was constructed c.1903. Among its guests was a young Preston Sturges, who stayed there in 1914 while his mother lived with Isadora Duncan at the Ritz-Carlton Hotel.  A townhouse on the north side of the Park was provided for Duncan's dancing school, and their studio was nearby on the northeast corner of Park Avenue South (then Fourth Avenue) and 23rd Street. The Hotel Irving was converted to a co-op in 1986.

In the center of the park is a statue of one of the area's most famous residents, Edwin Booth, which was dedicated on November 13, 1918. Booth was one of the great Shakespearean actors of 19th Century America, as well as the brother of John Wilkes Booth, the assassin of Abraham Lincoln. The mansion at No. 16 Gramercy Park (South) was purchased by Booth and renovated by Stanford White at his request to be the home of the Players' Club, which Booth founded.  He turned over the deed to the building on New Year's Eve 1888. Next door at No. 15 Gramercy Park (South) is the National Arts Club, established in 1884 in a Victorian Gothic mansion which was originally home to the New York Governor and 1876 Presidential Candidate, Samuel J. Tilden.  Tilden had steel doors and an escape tunnel to East 19th Street to protect himself from the sometimes violent politics of the day.

On September 20, 1966, a part of the Gramercy Park neighborhood was designated an historic district, the boundaries of which were extended on July 12, 1988. The district was listed on the National Register of Historic Places in 1980. A proposed extension of the district would include nearby buildings such as the Manhattan Trade School for Girls, now the School of the Future, and the Children's Court and Family Court buildings, now part of Baruch College, all on East 22nd Street.

In 1983, Fantasy Fountain, a  bronze sculpture by Greg Wyatt was installed in the park.

One of the most significant steam explosions in New York City occurred near Gramercy Park in 1989, killing two Consolidated Edison workers and one bystander, and causing damage of several million dollars to area buildings.

In 2012, 18 Gramercy Park South – formerly the Salvation Army's Parkside Evangeline Residence for Women and then a facility of the School of Visual Arts – was sold to Eyal Ofer's Global Holdings and the Zeckendorf brothers for $60 million for conversion into condominium apartments by Robert A. M. Stern, including a $42 million penthouse duplex. The 17-story building is the tallest around the park and dates from 1927.

Ownership and access to the park

Since December 31, 1831, Gramercy Park has been held in common by the owners of the 39 surrounding structures. Two keys are allocated to each of the original lots surrounding the park, and the owners may buy keys for a fee, which was originally $10 per key, but  was $350, with a $1,000 fee for lost keys, which rises to $2,000 for a second instance. The Medeco locks are changed annually, and any property that does not pay the annual assessment of $7,500 per lot has its key privileges revoked; additionally, the keys are very hard to duplicate. , there were 383 keys in circulation, each individually numbered and coded.

Members of the Players Club and the National Arts Club as well as guests of the Gramercy Park Hotel, which has 12 keys, have access, as does Calvary Church and the Brotherhood Synagogue; hotel guests are escorted to the park and picked up later by hotel staff. In addition, the owners of the luxury condominium apartments at 57 Irving Place, completed in 2012, can obtain key access to the park by becoming members of the Players Club, even though the building is located several blocks from the park.

At one time, the park was open to the public on an annual Gramercy Day whose date changed each year but was often the first Saturday in May. In 2007, the trustees announced that the park would no longer be open for Gramercy Day because it "had turned into a street fair". The park, however, continues to be open to the public on Christmas Eve. Visitors to the park may not drink alcohol, smoke, ride a bicycle, walk a dog, play ball or Frisbee, or feed the birds and squirrels.

In 2001, Aldon James of the National Arts Club that adjoins the park brought about 40 children, mostly minorities, into the park from the nearby Washington Irving High School on Irving Place.  The trustee at the time, Sharen Benenson, called police alleging that the children were trespassing. The police refused to take action.  Later, a suit was filed against the park's administration in Federal Court. The suit was settled out of court in 2003. Most of the children settled for $36,000 each, while one received $50,000.

In December 2014, it was revealed in The New York Times that 360-degree panoramic pictures of the interior of the park – taken using Photo Sphere, a Google app within Google Street View, by Shawn Christopher from the Pittsburgh area – had been posted to Google Maps.  Christopher got access to the park by renting a room through the Airbnb service and using the key to the park which came with the room.  The Gramercy Park Block Association – which did not know about the photographs until informed by a Times reporter – did not give Christopher permission to shoot in the park, and he was unaware that photography was generally forbidden.

Demographics

Based on data from the 2010 United States Census, the population of Gramercy Park was 27,988, an increase of 1,804 (6.9%) from the 26,184 counted in 2000. The racial makeup of the neighborhood was 73.7% (20,623) White, 3.3% (923) African American, 0.1% (19) Native American, 13.4% (3,740) Asian, 0.0% (10) Pacific Islander, 0.3% (77) from other races, and 2.0% (573) from two or more races. Hispanic or Latino of any race were 7.2% (2,023) of the population.

Surrounding neighborhood 
The neighborhood, which is called either "Gramercy Park" or "Gramercy", is generally considered to be a quiet and safe area. While real estate in Manhattan is rarely stable, the apartments in the neighborhood around Gramercy Park have experienced little turmoil.  East 19th Street between Third Avenue and Irving has been called "Block Beautiful" for its wide array of architecture and pristine aesthetic. Townhouses with generous backyards and smaller apartments alike coincide in a collage of architecture in Gramercy Park. The largest private house in the neighborhood, a 42-room mansion on Gramercy Park South, was on sale for $7 million in 1993.

The Gramercy Park neighborhood is located in the part of Manhattan where the bedrock Manhattan schist is located deeper underground than it is above 29th Street and below Canal Street, and as a result, and under the influence of zoning laws, the tallest buildings in the area top out at around 20 stories, and older buildings of 3–6 floors are numerous, especially on the side streets, but even on the avenues.

The quiet streets perpendicular to Irving Place have maintained their status as fashionable residential blocks reminiscent of London's West End. In 1912, a multiple dwelling planned specifically for bachelors appeared at 52 Irving Place. A Colonial Revival style structure with suites of rooms that lacked kitchen facilities was one of a small group of New York apartment houses planned for single men in the early years of the 20th century.

Gramercy Park Hotel

Gramercy Park Hotel was originally designed by Robert T. Lyons and built by Bing & Bing in 1925, replacing a row of townhouses.  It was managed for many years by hotelier Herbert Weissberg, and in 2006 underwent a massive makeover by Ian Schrager, who in 2010 sold his interests and is no longer associated with the hotel.  Interiors were designed by artist and filmmaker Julian Schnabel. The Hotel has views of Gramercy Park, and guests have access to the hotel's 12 keys to the park during their stay.  Dining venues include the Rose Bar and Jade Bar, and rooftop Gramercy Terrace restaurant; Danny Meyer's Maialino is also in the Hotel.

The Hotel was the subject of a 2008 documentary film, Hotel Gramercy Park.

Irving Place

An assortment of restaurants, bars, and establishments line Irving Place, the main thoroughfare of the neighborhood south of the park. Pete's Tavern, New York's oldest surviving saloon, and where O. Henry is often erroneously said to have written The Gift of the Magi, survived Prohibition disguised as a flower shop. Irving Plaza, at East 15th Street and Irving, hosts numerous concerts for both well-known and indie bands and draws a crowd almost every night. There are also a number of clinics and official city buildings on Irving Place.

Education

Schools
Two public high schools are located in the area: Washington Irving High School on Irving Place, and the School of the Future on 22nd Street at Lexington Avenue, which is also a middle school.

P.S. 40, the Augustus Saint-Gaudens School, serving grades Pre-K to 5, is the only general public elementary school in the neighborhood; it is located on East 20th Street between First and Second Avenues, near the Augustus Saint-Gaudens Playground, Peter's Field, and the park at Stuyvesant Square. The building also houses a middle school named after Jonas Salk: the Salk School of Science, serving grades 6–8. M.S. 104 the Simon Baruch Middle School, which also serves grades 6–8, is located just east of,  P.S. 40 and Salk, on the same block but across the street. Nearby, on East 23rd Street, is the American Sign Language and English School, a public elementary and middle school which provides American Sign Language immersion education for deaf and hearing children. The ASL and English School building also hosts other public school programs.

Also located in the neighborhood is The Epiphany School, a Catholic elementary school on 22nd Street at Second Avenue. Founded in 1885 for religious instruction in the parish of the Epiphany, the school has been a landmark – gutted and rebuilt – in the neighborhood for generations. At 20th Street and Second Avenue is a new building for the Learning Spring School, a private school for high-functioning autistic children funded by the Simons Foundation Autism Research Initiative. The building houses an elementary and middle school, grades K-8.

The École Internationale de New York, a French international school, is primarily located in the Gramercy Park neighborhood, partly at 111 East 22nd Street between Park and Lexington Avenues, where the 1st, 2nd and 3rd grades and the Middle School are sited; and partly in the "Renwick Gem" of Calvary Church at 277 Park Avenue, where the 4th and 5th grades are located.  There is also a preschool at 206 Fifth Avenue between West 25th and 26th Streets in the NoMad neighborhood.

Higher education
The buildings of Baruch College of the City University of New York (CUNY) are located in the neighborhood or nearby. Baruch College's Lawrence and Eris Field Building is located at the southeast corner of Lexington Avenue and 23rd Street in Gramercy. The facilities of The School of Visual Arts are located on East 23rd Street and elsewhere. SVA students are housed in Gramercy Park Women's Residence, George Washington Hotel and the New Residence. In addition, New York University's Gramercy Green dormitory is located in Gramercy.

Library
The New York Public Library (NYPL)'s Epiphany branch is located at 228 East 23rd Street. The Epiphany branch opened in 1887 and moved to its current structure, a two-story Carnegie library, in 1907. It was renovated from 1982 to 1984.

Police, crime and fire
Gramercy, along with Stuyvesant Town and Madison Square, is patrolled by the 13th Precinct of the NYPD, located at 230 East 21st Street. The 13th Precinct and neighboring 17th Precinct ranked 57th safest out of 69 patrol areas for per-capita crime in 2010. The high per-capita crime rate is attributed to the precincts' high number of property crimes.

The 13th Precinct has a lower crime rate than in the 1990s, with crimes across all categories having decreased by 80.7% between 1990 and 2018. The precinct reported 2 murders, 18 rapes, 152 robberies, 174 felony assaults, 195 burglaries, 1,376 grand larcenies, and 37 grand larcenies auto in 2018.

Gramercy is served by two New York City Fire Department (FDNY) fire stations. Engine Co. 5 is located at 340 East 14th Street while Engine Co. 14 is located at 14 East 18th Street.

Hospitals
Although Gramercy is not far from "hospital row" on First Avenue above 23rd Street, the primary medical center in its boundaries is Beth Israel Medical Center between East 15th and 17th Streets off of First Avenue.  Nearby is the Hospital for Joint Diseases, part of the NYU Medical Center, and the New York Eye and Ear Infirmary on 14th Street. Cabrini Medical Center, on East 19th and 20th Streets, closed down in 2008, but the buildings were purchased by Memorial Sloan-Kettering Cancer Center in 2010, for use as a cancer outpatient facility.

Post office and ZIP Codes
Gramercy is located in two ZIP Codes. The area south of 20th Street is located in 10003, while the area north of 20th Street is located in 10010. The United States Postal Service operates the Madison Square Station post office at 149 East 23rd Street.

Notable residents

Around the park
 No. 1 – Amos Pinchot – brother of former Governor of Pennsylvania
 No. 1 – Valentine Mott – an original resident, chief medical officer of the Union Army and founder of Bellevue Hospital and NYU Medical School
 No. 2 – James W. Pinchot – businessman and father of Gifford Pinchot, who was the first chief of the U.S. Forest Service
 #3&4 – James Harper – an original resident, 1847–1869, Mayor of New York from 1844 to 1845 and one of the founders of the Harper publishing firm; the two iron lamps outside No. 4 were placed there by the city in Harper's honor: the custom was that mayor's residences were so distinguished so that he would be available for nighttime emergencies
 #5 – Vincent Astor –  businessman, philanthropist, member of the Astor family
 No. 7 – Julia Roberts
 No. 10 – Henrietta B. Haines – novelist
 No. 11 – Robert Henri – American painter
 No. 11 – Samuel L. M. Barlow II – composer, patron of the arts
 No. 15 – Samuel J. Tilden – whose house, a National Historic Landmark, is now the National Arts Club
 No. 16 – Edwin Booth – famed Shakespearean actor, founded the Players Club
 No. 19 – Stuyvesant Fish – a leader of New York society (1887)
 No. 19 – Edward Sheldon – playwright
 No. 19 – William C. Bullitt – diplomat, journalist and novelist
 No. 19 – Benjamin Sonnenberg – publicist
 No. 19 - Richard Tyler - designer
 No. 19 - Henry Jarecki - entrepreneur
 No. 24 – Richard Watson Gilder – the poet and editor died in this house
 No. 24 – Thomas Alva Edison – inventor
 No. 24 – Albert Gallatin – Secretary of the Treasury
 No. 26 – Booth Tarkington – novelist and dramatist
 No. 26 – Steinway family – manufacturers of Steinway pianos
 No. 34 – James Cagney, Margaret Hamilton, and Gregory Peck,
 No. 36 – John Barrymore – star of stage and screen
 No. 36 – Daniel Chester French – sculptor responsible for the seated figure of Lincoln at the Lincoln Memorial in Washington, D.C.
 No. 36 – Alfred Ringling – founder of the Ringling Brothers Circus
 No. 38 – John Steinbeck – American author
 No. 44 – Hart Crane – poet
 Where the Gramercy Park Hotel and the connected 50 Gramercy Park North co-op are now located:
 Stanford White – architect
 Robert G. Ingersoll – orator
 Elsewhere around the park:
Frances Bavier – American stage and television actress, Aunt Bee on the Andy Griffith Show
John Bigelow – lawyer and statesman, who lived at 21 Gramercy Park
Vincent D'Onofrio- actor, producer, director, and singer
Jimmy Fallon – host of The Tonight Show Starring Jimmy Fallon
Henry Herbert – English actor and producer
Robert H. Ingersoll – businessman
Karl Lagerfeld – fashion designer
Maud Powell – female concert violinist and suffrage pioneer who cast her first ballot in 1919
George Templeton Strong – lawyer and diarist, an original resident, who lived at 55 Gramercy Park North
Uma Thurman – actress
Rufus Wainwright – musician

Around the neighborhood
 John Avlon and Margaret Hoover, newscasters
 Peter Cooper – industrialist, entrepreneur and philanthropist, lived just north of the park at 9 Lexington Avenue.
 Joseph P. Day (1874–1944), real estate broker and developer and auctioneer
 Theodore Roosevelt's birthplace on 20th Street is a National Historic Site.
 Edith Wharton – author, born at 14 West 23rd Street and attended Calvary Church
 Oscar Wilde took rooms at 47 Irving Place for a while in 1882, some ten years before his future literary agent in America, Elisabeth Marbury set up home next door at 49 Irving Place with interior designer Elsie de Wolfe. De Wolfe and Marbury were said to be the most fashionable lesbian couple of Victorian New York.
 Chelsea Clinton, the daughter of U.S. President Bill Clinton and First Lady Hillary Clinton, as well as her husband Marc Mezvinsky, used to live in the neighborhood before moving to nearby NoMad, selling their apartment for $4 million.

Many actors, actresses and artists live in the district including Kate Hudson, Whitney Port, Joshua Bell, Jimmy Fallon and Amanda Lepore. Amanda Peet grew up in the neighborhood. Winona Ryder once resided in Gramercy Park, but sold her co-operative apartment in 2008. The fashion designer Narciso Rodriguez has his studio on Irving Place and the neighborhood is home to numerous models' apartments from nearby agencies on Broadway. NBC News anchor Ann Curry also lives in the neighborhood. Actor Jim Parsons also maintains a residence there.

In popular culture

Literature:
1892: John Seymour Wood's Gramercy Park: A Story of New York may be one of the first literary works set in the area
1945: In E. B. White's children's book Stuart Little, the Little family live at "22 Gramercy Park", which White describes as "[A] pleasant place near a park in New York City."  White also wrote a poem called "Gramercy Park", which was published in The New Yorker, about him and a friend climbing over the fence into the park.
1949: Henry Noble MacCracken's The Family on Gramercy Park is set in the neighborhood.
1961: Medusa in Gramercy Park is a book of poems by Horace Gregory
1963: It's Like This, Cat, the Newbery award winning children's book set in Gramercy Park by Emily Cheney Neville.
1965: The address in the title of Priscilla Dalton's 90 Gramercy Park does not actually exist.
1970: A character in Jack Finney's Time and Again lives in 19 Gramercy Park South around 1882.
1982: In The Brownstone House of Nero Wolfe by Ken Darby, the character Archie Goodwin states that Nero Wolfe's townhouse was actually on East 22nd Street in the Gramercy Park district rather than the fictional West 35th street address(es) given in the novels to protect Wolfe's privacy.
1983: Bruce Nicolaysen's The Pirate of Gramercy Park is part of the Novel of New York multi-generation family historical fiction series.
1988: In the book Changes for Samantha, part of the American Girl series, Samantha stays at her Uncle Gardner and Aunt Cordelia's brownstone house in Gramercy Park.
1996: Author Lynn Kurland's heroine Elizabeth Smith falls asleep on a bench in 1996's Gramercy Park only to wake up in 1311 Scotland in A Dance Through Time.
2001: The mystery novel Murder on Gramercy Park by Victoria Thompson is part of the Gaslight Mystery series
2003: Paula Cohen's historical novel Gramercy Park is set in 1894.
2005: The Monsters of Gramercy Park by Danny Leigh is a psychological thriller.
2006: Several key scenes of Jed Rubenfeld's historical thriller The Interpretation of Murder, which is set in New York in 1909, take place in the park itself and the houses nearby, where one of the book's main protagonists lives.
2007: The Luxe, a book by Anna Godbersen, takes place in the neighborhood around Gramercy Park.
2010: In his memoir Assholes Finish First, Tucker Max recounts that he gained access to Gramercy Park to win a bet with a female acquaintance. To satisfy her end of the bet, she was required to give him fellatio while he was sitting on a bench in the park.
2010:  Author Danielle Steel writes about Gramercy Park in her novel Big Girl.

Films: 
Note: Gramercy Park is a private park, and film companies are not usually allowed to shoot there.
1935: In Howard Hawks' film Barbary Coast, the character Jim Carmichael, played by Joel McCrea, is said to live at 14 Gramercy Park, although currently residing in San Francisco, while the protagonist Mary Rutledge (Miriam Hopkins) played in the park as a child.
1973: In the science fiction film Soylent Green, which is set in New York in 2022, a corrupt New York governor escorts some children into a tent, saying, "This was once called Gramercy Park, boys. Now it's the only tree sanctuary in New York."
1979: In the film The Warriors, one of the fictional gangs featured is the Gramercy Riffs, the biggest gang in New York.
1993: The exterior of the park can be seen in the Woody Allen film Manhattan Murder Mystery. The characters in the film comment on the beauty of the park from a wine tasting filmed in the National Arts Club. Later in the film Diane Keaton and Alan Alda walk into the street directly in front of the park as they try to track a bus route.
1999: In the film Notting Hill, a famous actress, played by Julia Roberts, is shown starring in a film called Gramercy Park, which was also the name of the production company for Notting Hill.
2014: In the film That Awkward Moment, a couple, played by Zac Efron and Imogen Poots, steal a key to the park while being shown a house in Gramercy Park.

Music:
1969: American guitarist/songwriter Stefan Grossman released an album called The Gramercy Park Sheik
1985: Charly Garcia and Pedro Aznar's album Tango contains a track titled "Gramercy Park Hotel".
1989: American jazz-funk/soul-jazz saxophonist Grover Washington, Jr.'s album Time Out of Mind contains a track titled "Gramercy Park."
1997: Australian singer-songwriter Ben Lee released a song titled "Grammercy sic Park Hotel" on his album Something to Remember Me By.
2000: Jazz fusion/rock duo Steely Dan mentioned the park in "Janie Runaway", from its album Two Against Nature in the lyrics "Down in Tampa the future looked desperate and dark / Now you're the wonder waif of Gramercy Park".
2001: Dutch jazz pianist Michiel Borstlap owns a record label called "Gramercy Park" and he also composed a tune with the same name.
2002: Electronic rock band Deadsy released a song entitled "The Key to Gramercy Park" on their album Commencement.
2013: American guitarist Steve Hunter's album The Manhattan Blues Project contains a track titled "Gramercy Park".
2015: Indie rock band Milo Green album Control contains a track titled "Gramercy".
2020: American singer-songwriter Alicia Keys's album Alicia contains a song titled "Gramercy Park".

Television:

 1994: In the animated series Gargoyles, the villainous Demona resides in a townhouse located in Gramercy Park.
 2005 In the Law & Order episode, "Dining Out", the body of the murder victim is found in Gramercy Park. 
 2017 In the fourth season of the TV series Broad City, Abbi and Ilana save a man who is choking by doing the Heimlich maneuver through the park gate, but he still refuses to let them into the park.
 2019 In the Dimension 20 season The Unsleeping City, The Gramercy Occult Society is based near the park.
 2022 In Uncoupled, the main character, Michael (Neil Patrick Harris), lives at 44 Gramercy Park North.

Stage:
1994-9: Toni Ann Johnson's play Gramercy Park is Closed to the Public –  which centers on the life of an upper middle class woman of mixed race and her romantic relationship with a white policeman – was produced in the summer of 1994 by The Fountainhead Theatre Company in Los Angeles at The Hudson Theatre. It was also produced by the New York Stage and Film Company in Summer 1999 at Vassar College in Poughkeepsie, New York.

Gallery

See also

 List of neighborhoods in Manhattan

References
Informational notes

Citations

Further reading
"Samuel B. Ruggles, Founder Of Gramercy Park", Antiques Digest, reprinted. Originally published 1921.
Brooks, Gladys (1958) Gramercy Park: Memories of a New York Girlhood New York: Dutton
Klein, Carole (1987) Gramercy Park: An American Bloomsbury New York: Houghton Mifflin
Pine, John B. (1921) The Story of Gramercy Park: 1831–1921 New York: Gramercy Park Association

External links

Gramercy Park in the NYC Insider: an Insider's Guide to New York City
"Gramercy Park Historic District and Extension" map at nyc.gov
"Proposed Gramercy Park Historic District Extension" on the Gramercy Neighborhood Associates website
Gramercy Park on Citysearch NYC 
History of the Gramercy Park Hotel 
Gramercy Neighborhood Associates Records, 1828–2009 (bulk, 1912–2009), PR 370, at the New-York Historical Society.

Images
New York Architecture Images- SEARCH- gramercy park, kips bay
recent photos of Gramercy Park

 
Neighborhoods in Manhattan
Parks in Manhattan
Squares in Manhattan
Historic districts on the National Register of Historic Places in Manhattan
New York City Designated Landmarks in Manhattan
New York City designated historic districts
Communal gardens